"Somebody Have Mercy" is a song by American singer-songwriter Sam Cooke, originally released in April 1962 on the album Twistin' the Night Away.

Background
One line in the song ("Tell me what is wrong with me") created speculation and rampant rumors that Cooke was suffering from leukemia, which was false.

Personnel
"Somebody Have Mercy" was recorded on February 15, 1962 at RCA Studio 1 in Hollywood, California. The musicians also recorded much of the Twistin' the Night Away album the same day. The session was conducted and arranged by René Hall, producers were Hugo & Luigi. Credits adapted from the liner notes to the 2003 compilation Portrait of a Legend: 1951–1964.
Sam Cooke – vocals
Edward Beal – piano

Charts and certifications

Weekly charts
"Somebody Have Mercy" was later was selected for the B-side of the single "Nothing Can Change This Love", which was released on September 11, 1962. It received enough airplay to make the Billboard charts on its own, peaking at No. 3 R&B and No. 70 Pop.

References

1962 singles
Sam Cooke songs
Songs written by Sam Cooke
1962 songs
Song recordings produced by Hugo & Luigi
Soul ballads
RCA Victor singles